"45" is a song by American rock band the Gaslight Anthem, released on May 8, 2012 as the lead single from their fourth studio album, Handwritten (2012).

Composition
"45" was the first song written for Handwritten. Lead singer, Brian Fallon said of the song, "This record was different, because when we started out, I didn't know what was gonna happen, you know, and after American Slang after The '59 Sound, I was like, 'What am I gonna do? Is there anymore Gaslight songs?' It's a scary thing when that feeling, it hits you. When we wrote the song '45', I was like, 'Thank God.' I just knew that it was gonna be alright."

Music video
The music video features the band playing the song for a live audience at the legendary New Jersey music venue, The Stone Pony.

In other media
"45" is part of the soundtrack to the video game NHL 13, as a playable track in Guitar Hero Live, and as a downloadable song in Rocksmith 2014.

Track listing

Charts

Weekly charts

Year-end charts

External links
The Making of "45"
"45" Music Video
[ "45" on Billboard Charts]

References

2012 singles
2012 songs
The Gaslight Anthem songs
Song recordings produced by Brendan O'Brien (record producer)